Álvaro Villete is an Uruguayan football goalkeeper who plays for Sabah in the Azerbaijan Premier League on loan from Patriotas Boyacá.

Club career
On 21 September 2020, Sabah FC announced the signing of Villete on one-year long loan.

References

External links
 

1991 births
Living people
Association football goalkeepers
Uruguayan footballers
Uruguayan expatriate footballers
C.A. Cerro players
Atenas de San Carlos players
Deportivo Armenio footballers
C.A. Progreso players
Patriotas Boyacá footballers
Sabah FC (Azerbaijan) players
Categoría Primera A players
Uruguayan Primera División players
Uruguayan Segunda División players
Primera B Metropolitana players
Uruguayan expatriate sportspeople in Argentina
Uruguayan expatriate sportspeople in Colombia
Uruguayan expatriate sportspeople in Azerbaijan
Expatriate footballers in Argentina
Expatriate footballers in Colombia
Expatriate footballers in Azerbaijan